Bump and Run may refer to

Bump and run coverage, a defensive strategy in American football
Bump and run (auto racing)
Bump and run (golf)